Claes Adolf Adelsköld (7 September 1824 – 1 October 1907) was a Swedish civil engineer, railway engineer, author, Army officer and member of the upper house of the Parliament of Sweden

Background 
Adelsköld was born at Nolhaga in Alingsås Municipality in Västra Götaland County, Sweden.
He was as a member of the noble Adelsköld family. His brother Carl Gabriel Adelsköld (1830–1914) was a noted painter.

Military and engineering 
He studied at Chalmers University of Technology in Gothenburg, serving in the Swedish Army's Göta Artillery Regiment and became a lieutenant in 1844 in the Värmland jäger regiment; in 1849 he participated in the creation of the first Swedish railway open to civilian use. In 1852, he became a lieutenant in the newly organized Civil Engineering Corps, and continued to advance in the Corps until taking leave in 1875, when he was elected a member of the Riksdag. 
With 26 years in railway and canal construction, in 1865 he had become an ombudsman for the Hjälmare kanal.

Political career 
In 1875, he was elected a member of the upper house of the Riksdag (which at that time was bicameral), in which he served until 1893: at first for Västerbotten County and later for Blekinge County. He was a supporter of free trade and showed particular interest in defense issues.

Personal life 
In 1867 he bought Steninge Palace (Steninge Slott) in Sigtuna Municipality, where he led an extensive social life with people that included Prince Oscar (the future Oscar II). He sold the castle in 1873 and in 1876 repurchased the traditional family property in Alingsås Municipality, where he built a manor house known as Nolhaga slott.

In 1870 he was elected to the Swedish Academy of Sciences, of which he became chairman in 1891. He died in Stockholm and was buried at Stadskyrkogården in Alingsås. Adelsköldsgatan near the railway station in Alingsås was named in his honor.

Partial bibliography 
En resa till Nordkap (1889) A trip to the North Cape
Äventyr under en resa till Bornholm (1892) Adventure during a trip to Bornholm 
Utdrag ur mitt dagsverks, o. pro diverse konto (2:a uppl. i fyra band, totalt 1764 sidor, Albert Bonniers Förlag , 1899-1901). Excerpts from my day-work (2nd edition in four volumes, totaling 1764 pages)
Karl den tolfte och svenskarne. En historisk studie (del 1-2, 1903). Charles the Twelfth and Swedish trees: A historical study 
Uttalanden i malmfrågan (1907) Statements on the ore issue 
Konung Gustaf Eriksson Wasa (1907) King Gustav Eriksson Vasa

References

1824 births
1907 deaths
People from Alingsås Municipality
Chalmers University of Technology alumni
19th-century Swedish nobility
Swedish Army officers
Members of the Första kammaren
Members of the Royal Swedish Academy of Sciences
Swedish civil engineers
Members of the Royal Society of Sciences and Letters in Gothenburg
19th-century Swedish politicians
19th-century Swedish military personnel

Pioneers of rail transport
Swedish people in rail transport